Karadžićevo is a village in Croatia, municipality Markušica, Vukovar-Syrmia County.

History
Until 1920, the village was called Križevci. The settlement was originally a pustara, a Pannonian type of hamlet. After the Salonika front, Serbian volunteers settled the village and changed its name into Karadžićevo. The village was named after Vuk Karadzic. During the Croatian War of Independence, Karadžićevo was controlled by the self-proclaimed SAO Eastern Slavonia, Baranja and Western Syrmia. Croat special police stationed in Varaždin attacked the village which made it suffer major damage although the SAO won the battle.

Demographic history
According to the 1991 census, the village was inhabited by a majority of Serbs (83.21%), and minority of Croats (14.59%).

See also
Markušica Municipality

References

Populated places in Vukovar-Syrmia County
Populated places in Syrmia
Joint Council of Municipalities
Serb communities in Croatia